Tony Gregory (5 December 1947 – 2 January 2009) was an Irish independent politician, and a Teachta Dála (TD) for the Dublin Central constituency from 1982 to 2009.

Early life
Gregory was born in Ballybough on Dublin's Northside, the second child of Anthony Gregory and Ellen Gregory (née Judge). His mother, born in 1904 in Croghan, County Offaly, had moved to Dublin to work as a waitress, while his father, born in the North Strand area of Dublin, worked as a warehouseman in Dublin Port. His family originally lived in a one-room apartment in Charleville Street. The family applied to be housed by Dublin Corporation but were denied, with an official saying "come back when you have six [children]". The incident left an impression on Gregory, and he would refer to it in interviews later in life. The family was able later to move to a house in Sackville Gardens, near the Royal Canal, using money they had saved. Gregory won a Dublin Corporation scholarship to the Christian Brothers’ O'Connell School. He later went on to University College Dublin (UCD), where he received a Bachelor of Arts degree and later a Higher Diploma in Education, funding his degree from summer work at the Wall's ice cream factory in Acton, London. Initially working at Synge Street CBS, Gregory later taught at Coláiste Eoin, an Irish-language secondary school in Booterstown, where he taught history and French. His students both at Synge Street and Coláiste Eoin included John Crown, Colm Mac Eochaidh, Aengus Ó Snodaigh and Liam Ó Maonlaí.

Political career

Sinn Féin and the IRSP
He became involved in republican politics, joining Sinn Féin and the IRA in 1964. In UCD he helped found the UCD Republican Club, despite pressure from college authorities, and became involved with the Dublin Housing Action Committee. Within the party he was a supporter of Wicklow Republican Seamus Costello. Costello, who was a member of Wicklow County Council, emphasised involvement in local politics and was an opponent of abstentionism. Gregory sided with the Officials in the 1970 split within Sinn Féin. Despite having a promising future within the party, he resigned in 1972 citing frustration with ideological infighting in the party. Later, his mentor Costello —who had been expelled by Official Sinn Féin — approached him and asked him to join his new party, the Irish Republican Socialist Party. Gregory left the party after Costello's assassination in 1977, stating in a Hot Press interview, published after his death, that he had "agreed to join on paper, but had never got involved with the political organisation itself". He was briefly associated with the Socialist Labour Party.

Independent politician
Gregory contested the 1979 local elections for Dublin City Council as a "Dublin Community Independent" candidate. At the February 1982 general election he was elected to Dáil Éireann as an Independent TD.

Work as a TD
On his election in February 1982 he immediately achieved national prominence through the famous "Gregory Deal", which he negotiated with Fianna Fáil leader Charles Haughey. In return for supporting Haughey as Taoiseach, Gregory was guaranteed a massive cash injection for his inner-city Dublin constituency, an area beset by poverty and neglect.

The deal was witnessed by ITGWU leader Michael Mullen and all details were made public. The written agreement included commitments to nationalise a  site in Dublin Port and Clondalkin Paper Mills. A total of £4 million was to be allocated to employ 500 extra people in the inner city, while 3,746 jobs were to be created over three years. State funding would be provided to build 440 new houses in the constituency and another 1,600 in the rest of Dublin. The whole deal was worth an estimated £100 million at the time, in comparison to the £850,000 deal offered by Garret FitzGerald of Fine Gael. Although Gregory was reviled in certain quarters for effectively holding a government to ransom, his uncompromising commitment to the poor was widely admired. Fianna Fáil lost power at the November 1982 general election, and a lot of the promises made in the Gregory Deal were not implemented by the incoming Fine Gael-Labour Party coalition.

He was involved in the 1980s in tackling Dublin's growing drug problem. Heroin had largely been introduced to Dublin by the Dunne criminal group, based in Crumlin, in the late 1970s. In 1982 a report revealed that 10% of 15- to 24-year-olds had used heroin at least once in the north inner city. The spread of heroin use also led to a sharp increase in petty crime. Gregory confronted the government's handling of the problem as well as senior Gardaí, for what he saw as their inadequate response to the problem. He co-ordinated with the Concerned Parents Against Drugs group in 1986, who protested and highlighted the activities of local drug dealers, and defended the group against accusations by government Ministers Michael Noonan and Barry Desmond that it was a front for the Provisional IRA. During a public meeting held by the group, Gregory told Charlie Dunne, an associate of the Dunne criminal group, that "If you had any decency left in you, you'd walk straight into the Liffey and drown yourself". Gregory however believed that the solution to the problem was multi-faceted and worked on a number of policy level efforts across policing, service co-ordination and rehabilitation of addicts. In 1995 in an article in The Irish Times, he proposed what would later turn into the Criminal Assets Bureau which was set up in 1996, catalysed by the death of journalist Veronica Guerin. His role in its development would be acknowledged later by the then Minister of Justice Nora Owen.

He also advocated for Dublin's street traders. After attending a sit-down protest with Sinn Féin Councillor Christy Burke, and future Labour Party TD Joe Costello on Dublin's O'Connell Street in defence of a street trader; he, Burke and four others were arrested and charged with obstruction and threatening behaviour. He spent two weeks in Mountjoy Prison after refusing to sign a bond to keep the peace.

Gregory remained a TD from 1982 and, although he never held a government position, remained one of the country's most recognised Dáil deputies. He always refused to wear a tie in the Dáil chamber stating that many of his constituents could not afford them.

Death
He died on 2 January 2009, aged 61, following a long battle with cancer. Following his death, tributes poured in from politicians from every party, recognising his contribution to Dublin's north inner city. During his funeral, politicians from the Labour Party, Fianna Fáil and Fine Gael were told that although they spoke highly of Gregory following his death, during his time in the Dáil he had been excluded by many of them and that they were not to use his funeral as a "photo opportunity". He was buried on 7 January, with the Socialist Party's Joe Higgins delivering the graveside oration.

By-election
Colleagues of Tony Gregory supported his election agent, Dublin City Councillor Maureen O'Sullivan at the Dublin Central by-election in June 2009. O'Sullivan won the subsequent by-election.

Biography
Tony Gregory: The Biography of a True Irish Political Legend was published in 2011. The biography was written by Robbie Gilligan, and launched by Diarmaid Ferriter. Gregory's brother criticised the launch event as he was not able to speak at it.

Footnotes

References

Sources

Citations

1947 births
2009 deaths
Alumni of University College Dublin
People educated at O'Connell School
Deaths from cancer in the Republic of Ireland
Independent TDs
Irish Republican Socialist Party politicians
Irish republicans
Irish schoolteachers
Local councillors in Dublin (city)
Members of the 23rd Dáil
Members of the 24th Dáil
Members of the 25th Dáil
Members of the 26th Dáil
Members of the 27th Dáil
Members of the 28th Dáil
Members of the 29th Dáil
Members of the 30th Dáil
Politicians from Dublin (city)
Staff of Synge Street school